The Prophecy: Live in Europe is a live album by Painkiller, a band featuring John Zorn, Bill Laswell, and Yoshida Tatsuya, performing live in Berlin, Germany and Warsaw, Poland.

Reception

The AllMusic review by Mark Deming awarded the album 4 stars stating "Appearing seven years after it was recorded and over ten years after the last proper Pain Killer album, it's not difficult to read The Prophecy as a summing up of Zorn and Laswell's experiment in fusing free jazz and extreme metal, and it ultimately turns out to be more than the sum of its parts, making it compelling listening."

Track listing
All compositions by John Zorn, Bill Laswell and Yoshida Tatsuya
 "Prelude" – 2:12   
 "The Prophecy" – 64:53   
 "Postlude" – 2:50

Personnel
John Zorn – Saxophone
Bill Laswell – Bass
Yoshida Tatsuya – drums

References

Painkiller (band) albums
Albums produced by John Zorn
John Zorn live albums
2013 live albums
Tzadik Records live albums